Paradoris dubia is a species of sea slug, a dorid nudibranch, shell-less marine opisthobranch gastropod mollusks in the family Discodorididae.

Distribution
As a water-dwelling sea slug, Paradoris dubia can be found in waters around New South Wales, Tasmania, Victoria, and in the South Pacific Ocean surrounding Southern and Western Australia.

References

Discodorididae
Gastropods described in 1904